Rushbrooke is a train station in the Rushbrooke area, on Great Island in Cork harbour.

It is a station on the Cork to Cobh commuter service. Travel to Glounthaune station to transfer to Midleton.

Description
The station is unstaffed. Access is via a ramp to the Cork-bound platform but via stairs only to the Cobh-bound platform.

History
The station opened on 10 March 1862 and closed for goods traffic on 2 December 1974.

See also
 Cork Suburban Rail
 Metropolitan Cork

References

External links
Irish Rail Rushbrooke Station Website

Iarnród Éireann stations in County Cork
Railway stations in County Cork
Railway stations opened in 1862
1862 establishments in Ireland
Railway stations in the Republic of Ireland opened in the 19th century